The discography of Earl Thomas Conley, an American country music singer, consists of ten studio albums and 42 singles. He first charted in 1975 as Earl Conley for the GRT and Warner Bros. Records labels, before moving to Sunbird Records. He had his first number one in 1981 with "Fire & Smoke", and had a total of eighteen number ones between then and "Love Out Loud" in 1989.

Studio albums

APerpetual Emotion was re-released in 2003 under the title Should've Been Over By Now with one new song.

Compilation albums

Live albums

Singles

1970s

1980s onward

As a featured artist

Music videos

Notes

References

Conley, Earl Thomas
Discographies of American artists